Ahmadiyya is a messianic and revivalist movement within Islam.

Ahmadiyya may also refer to:

Ahmadiyya Caliphate
Ahmadiyya school (disambiguation)

See also
 
 Ahmadiyeh (disambiguation)